Mix 107 was a radio station, based in High Wycombe, England . It developed from an AM licence known as Elevenseventy and its successor operation Swan FM. The brand was a result of ownership by The Local Radio Company, owners of Mix 96 in neighbouring Aylesbury. Mix 107's building was the head office for the TLRC – a group with 22 other radio stations nationwide prior to its takeover by UKRD Group.

The station closed at 10am on 1 July 2009.

References

External links
 Official website

The Local Radio Company
Mix
Defunct radio stations in the United Kingdom
High Wycombe